The Petrofka Bridge is a Canadian bridge that spans the North Saskatchewan River south of Blaine Lake, Saskatchewan.  The bridge was named after Petrofka, a Doukhobor village near the bridge site. The bridge replaced the Petrofka and Laird ferry crossings that were near the bridge.

See also 
 List of crossings of the North Saskatchewan River
 List of bridges in Canada

References

External links 
 Official Opening of Petrofka Bridge on September 26, 1962.

Bridges completed in 1962
Bridges over the North Saskatchewan River
Road bridges in Saskatchewan
Blaine Lake No. 434, Saskatchewan